Jan Kozel (born 15 June 1996) is a Czech football coach.

Kozel is a Charles University graduate with a Bc. in Sport Studies and obtained a Master degree/MSc in Sport Science and Coaching at the Solent University. Kozel is a holder of the UEFA A Licence, the second highest-level coaching qualification in association football in Europe, which he completed under the supervision of his mentor, Sean O'Driscoll.

He got into coaching already when he played football in the Czech Republic and United Kingdom.

Playing career
As a player, Kozel was a defender and played in the Czech Republic and United Kingdom. He spent a year at the University of Central Lancashire where he combined his playing career with coaching and studies. He spent time with National League member AFC Fylde. During the season 2018/2019 he received an offer from Cardiff Metropolitan University where he could combine the Cymru Premier in Wales with his postgraduate studies. However, he was diagnosed with a mononucleosis that caused him to abandon any physical activity for several months. Eventually, he received a sport scholarship offer from Solent University in Southampton.

Coaching career
Kozel's first coaching experience was at SK Aritma Prague, commencing in 2016 while he played for this club as well. While studying at University of Central Lancashire, he coached at Preston North End FC academy. Since 2019, he was part of the Portsmouth FC where he worked as a Youth Development Phase coach and gained experience with the Professional Development Phase as well. During the Covid period in autumn 2020, he received an offer to take over the reserve team of FK Viktoria Žižkov as a head coach. This was his first opportunity to appear in senior football as a coach at a very young age. At the end of the season, SK Benešov appointed him as a Lead PDP coach and U19 coach.

Other activities
Currently, in addition to his coaching activities, he is involved in several projects in the field of children's physical and sport development. He is in the position of Football Association of the Czech Republic - Grassroots Youth Coach and is in cooperation with coaches and teachers in the Beroun district. Also in the project "Coaches in schools", which involves sports coaches in the teaching of physical education in primary schools. The sports in this program are rotated on a regular basis, thereby offering children varied activities and movement versatility. Furthermore, he cooperates with clubs on a conceptual and individual basis and, at the same time, continues with educational seminars for coaches, teachers and parents.

References

External links 
 

Czech footballers
1996 births
Living people
Association football defenders
SK Slavia Prague players
FK Dukla Prague players
AFC Fylde players
Lancaster City F.C. players
English Football League players
National League (English football) players
Czech expatriate sportspeople in England
Footballers from Prague
Charles University alumni